The 1999 Vodacom Cup was the 2nd edition of this annual domestic cup competition.

Competition
There were 15 teams participating in the 1999 Vodacom Cup. These teams were geographically divided into two sections - the Northern Section with eight teams and the Southern Section with seven teams. Teams would play all the other teams in their section twice over the course of the season, once at home and once away.

Teams received four points for a win and two points for a draw. Bonus points were awarded to teams that score four or more tries in a game, as well as to teams losing a match by seven points or less. Teams were ranked by points, then points difference (points scored less points conceded).

The top two teams in each section qualified for the play-offs. In the semi-finals, the teams that finished first in each section had home advantage against the teams that finished second in the other section. The winners of these semi-finals then played each other in the final.

Teams

Changes from 1998
The  joined the competition.
Section A was renamed Southern Section and Section B was renamed Northern Section.
The  moved from Section B to the Southern Section.
 moved from Section A to the Northern Section.

Team Listing
The following teams took part in the 1999 Vodacom Cup competition:

Tables

Northern Section

Southern Section

Results

Northern Section

Round one

Round two

Round three

Round four

Round Five

Round Six

Round Seven

Round Eight

Round Nine

Round Ten

Round Eleven

Round Twelve

Round Thirteen

Round Fourteen

Southern Section

Round one

Round two

Round three

Round four

Round Five

Round Six

Round Seven

Round Eight

Round Nine

Round Ten

Round Eleven

Round Twelve

Round Thirteen

Round Fourteen

Play-Offs

Semi-finals

Final

Winners

References
 1999 Vodacom Cup

Vodacom Cup
1999 in South African rugby union
1999 rugby union tournaments for clubs